Malviviendo (Spanish for bad living) is an online series produced by Diffferent and directed by David Sainz. In July 2011, the show released its fourteenth episode. The first episode launched on November 24, 2008, and became successful in a few months with positive reviews by the public.

It employs mostly amateur actors, and those involved in the series do it for free.

The series is set in the fictional neighborhood of "Los Banderilleros" of the Spanish city of Seville. The characters are a group of friends trapped in their everyday bad lives related to consumption of cannabis or other problems individual to each character.

The show contains allusions to and parodies of a variety of other series, including Dexter, My Name Is Earl, The Sopranos, Lost, ALF, The X-Files, Prison Break, Sex and the City, The Brady Bunch, South Park, Boardwalk Empire, The IT Crowd and How I Met Your Mother. Also the Spanish program Callejeros chain Cuatro in the fifth episode called Callejosos. In the third episode of the second season spoof the header of the series Misfits, but the content of the episode is a parody of the movie Memento (film).

In June 2009, the series got the support of Qualid (a project of Nokia's sponsorship of artists). There it launched two mini-episodes minicapítulos. One focused on the character of Mateo and the other in "el Puto".

Episodes

First season 
 Me llaman Negro (They Call Me Negro)
 La cosecha (The Crop)
 El próximo antes de ayer (The Next Day Before Yesterday)
 Chair Driver
 Callejosos
 Cuentos y Leyendas (Stories and Legends)
 Módulo tres (Module Three)
 No Girls
 Cicatrices (Scars)
 Se vende (For Sale)

Second season 
 La verdadera historia de Jesús Blanco (The True Story of Jesús Blanco)
 Fumar juntos, morir solos (Smoke Together, Die Alone)
 Mi amigo Walt (My Friend Walt)
 Mala vida sana (Healthy Bad Life)
 23 dias en Los Banderilleros Parte 1 (23 days in The Banderilleros Part 1)
 23 dias en Los Banderilleros Parte 2 (23 days in The Banderilleros Part 2)
 Amapolas Vs Jaramagos (Poppy Flowers Vrs Mustard Flowers)
 Amor y Muerte (Love and Death)
 Negra Navidad (Black Christmas)
 13.000€(€13.000)

Third season 
 La cosa está negra (Primera parte) (The thing is black (First Part))
 La cosa está negra (Segunda parte) (The thing is black (Second Part))
 Tetas y Collejas (Tits and slaps)
 Plan Pardo (Brown plan)
 Patrullero (Patroller)
 Traumusical
 Rescate en Los Banderilleros (Rescue Banderilleros)
 Felices 30 años (Happy 30 years)
 Asignaturas Pendientes (Unfinished subjects)
 Orgullo Banderillero (Banderillero pride)

Mini-episodes Minicapítulos 
 Kazakievo
 Puto destino puto
 Mortal Topic
 Mortal Topic 2: Salvar al soldado Pardo

References

External links 
 malviviendo.com
 Malviviendo's Forum
 Malviviendo in Qualid

Spanish humour
Comedy web series